Bella Block is a long-running German detective television series starring Hannelore Hoger as inspector Bella Block. The show was first broadcast in 1994 on ZDF and last aired in 2018, having run for 38 seasons.

See also
 List of German television series

External links
 

German crime television series
1990s German police procedural television series
2000s German police procedural television series
1994 German television series debuts
2018 German television series endings
2000s German television series
ZDF original programming
Television shows based on German novels
Detective television series
Television shows set in Hamburg
German-language television shows
Grimme-Preis for fiction winners